Semalea kola, Evans' silky skipper, is a butterfly in the family Hesperiidae. It is found in Nigeria (the Cross River loop) and Cameroon. The habitat consists of wet forests.

References

Butterflies described in 1937
Erionotini